Watcharin Nuengprakaew (born 18 January 1996) is a Thai professional footballer who plays as a centre-back  for the Thai League 2 club Nakhon Si United.

References

1996 births
Living people
Watcharin Nuengprakaew
Watcharin Nuengprakaew
Association football defenders
Watcharin Nuengprakaew
Watcharin Nuengprakaew
Nakhon Si United F.C. players